Equality Township may refer to:

 Equality Township, Gallatin County, Illinois
 Equality Township, Red Lake County, Minnesota
 Equality Township, Miller County, Missouri

Township name disambiguation pages